Zhao Jinmai (born September 29, 2002) is a Chinese actress. She is best known for her roles in the dramas Balala the Fairies: The Magic Trial (2014), Balala the Fairies: Princess Camellia (2015), A Little Thing Called First Love (2019), and Reset (2022). She is currently attending the Central Academy of Drama.

Early life 
Zhao was born in Liaoning, China on September 29, 2002.

Career 
Zhao started her acting career as a child actress in the early 2010s. She participated in several television series and films, in particularly the fantasy children film Balala the Fairies. In 2016, she starred in the urban family drama A Love for Separation, which was popular and introduced Zhao to a wider audience. In 2017, Zhao starred in the modern drama My! Physical Education Teacher. In 2018, Zhao starred in the comedy film Go Brother!.

In 2019, Zhao starred in the film The Wandering Earth, which was adapted from Liu Cixin's novel, playing the lead female character. The film is one of the highest grossing films in China and led to increased recognition for Zhao. The same year she gained recognition for her role in the family drama Growing Pain. She also played the lead female role in the youth romance drama  A Little Thing Called First Love.
Forbes China listed Zhao under their 30 Under 30 Asia 2019 list which consisted of 30 influential people under 30 years old who have had a substantial influence in their fields.

Filmography

Film

Television series

Variety show

Awards and nominations

References

External links

21st-century Chinese actresses
Actresses from Shenyang
2002 births
Living people
Chinese child actresses
Chinese film actresses
Chinese television actresses